Murugayan Kumaresan (born 13 January 1967) is a retired track cyclist from Malaysia, who represented his country at the 1988 Summer Olympics and the 1992 Summer Olympics.

References

External links
 Profile

1967 births
Living people
Malaysian people of Indian descent
Malaysian male cyclists
Cyclists at the 1988 Summer Olympics
Cyclists at the 1992 Summer Olympics
Olympic cyclists of Malaysia
People from Batu Pahat
Tamil sportspeople
People from Johor
Cyclists at the 1994 Asian Games
Cyclists at the 1990 Asian Games
Southeast Asian Games medalists in cycling
Southeast Asian Games gold medalists for Malaysia
Southeast Asian Games bronze medalists for Malaysia
Competitors at the 1987 Southeast Asian Games
Asian Games competitors for Malaysia
20th-century Malaysian people
21st-century Malaysian people